 was a Japanese photographer. He began photographing in the late 1960s in Iwaki, where he was born on 30 November 1943. He worked for thirty years in relative isolation. Suzuki's way of designing his photography books, layer upon layer upon layer, became central to his art.

Solo exhibitions
"Burāman no hikari" / "India". 1969.
"Tenmaku no machi" / "Mind Games". Ginza Nikon Salon (Tokyo), 1980.
. 1983.
"Gyōkan no nagame Gypsy wind Watakushi no 12-satsu". 1984.
. 1985.
. 1985.
. 1987.
"Nagare no uta" / "Sunday Picture". 1989.
"Fool's paradise (Tōkyō, Shōwa 61–63nen)". Shinjuku Nikon Salon (Tokyo), 1989.
. 1991.
"Kota Jakaruta" / "Southern Breeze". 1990s.
 / "From the Border." Ginza Nikon Salon (Tokyo), 1992. (Twice, the second time in celebration of winning the Ina Nobuo Award.) 
"Nagare no uta yori" / "Soul and Soul". 1990s.
. Ginza Nikon Salon (Tokyo), 1995.
"Handoreddo suteppu 1967–95". Ginza Nikon Salon (Tokyo), 1995.
"Dyurasu no ryōdo". 1996–98.
"Kiyoshi Suzuki: Soul and Soul, 1969–1999". Noorderlicht Photogallery (Groningen), March–May 2008.

Books by Suzuki
Nagare no uta: Suzuki Kiyoshi shashinshū / Soul and Soul. [Yokohama]: [Kiyoshi Suzuki], 1972.  Captions (including place and year) in Japanese only.
Facsimile edition. Tokyo: Hakusuisha, 2010. . Additional endpapers and dust cover, and a 12-page pamphlet with a commentary by Kōtarō Iizawa and a chronology in both Japanese and English.
Burāman no hikari: Suzuki Kiyoshi shashinshū. Yokohama: Sansara, 1976. Photographs of India.  Captions (placenames) in Roman script only, a short essay in both Japanese and English.
Tenmaku no machi / Mind Games. Yokohama: , 1982.
Yume no hashiri 1982–1987 / Street Shuffle. Yokohama: Ocean Books, 1988.
Nikutai no jidai: Taikenteki '60 nendai bunkaron. Tokyo: Gendai Shokan, 1989. Text by Kōshi Ueno (Ueno Kōshi); photographs by Suzuki. 
Gusha no fune: Tōkyō Shōwa 61–63: Suzuki Kiyoshi shashinshū / The Ship of Fools. Tokyo: IBC, 1991. .
Tenchi gijō / Kiyoshi Suzuki Photographs 1990–92. Yokohama: Taman Saribukkusu, 1992. 
Shūra no tani  / Finish Dying. Yokohama: Deku Bukkusu, 1994.
Dyurasu no ryōdo: Marugeritto Dyurasu no Ajia / Durasia. Yokohama: G. Sāguru, 1998.
Soul and Soul 1969–1999. Groningen: Aurora Borealis, 2008. . A reprint of Suzuki's extensively marked up dummy of the 1972 book.

Notes

References
Nakamura Hiromi (. "Suzuki Kiyoshi." Nihon shashinka jiten / 328 Outstanding Japanese Photographers. Kyoto: Tankōsha, 2000. . P.185.  
Shashinka wa nani o hyōgen shita ka: 1960–1980 (What were photographers expressing? 1960–1980). Tokyo: Konica Plaza, 1992.

External links
Suzuki's site, prepared by his widow. 
Ina Nobuo Shō 20 nen: Nikon Saron ni miru gendai shashin no keifu / Ina Nobuo Award '76–'95. Nikon Salon Books 23. Tokyo: Nikkor Club, 1996.  
Prüst, Marc. "Soul and Soul 1969-1999: photography by Kiyoshi Suzuki". Lensculture.com. Book review with sample photographs.
"Kiyoshi Suzuki: Soul and Soul, 1969–1999". Noorderlicht Photogallery.
Suzuki, Yōko. "Suzuki Kiyoshi no koto". Edagawakoichi.com. A note by Suzuki's widow. 

Japanese photographers
1943 births
2000 deaths